List of Statewide and Local Partners of the National Trust for Historic Preservation gathered from the Statewide & Local Partners contact list maintained by the National Trust for Historic Preservation.

 Abilene Preservation League
 Alliance for Historic Hillsborough
 Archaeology Southwest
 Architectural Heritage Center/Bosco-Milligan Foundation
 Baltimore Heritage
 Blue Grass Trust for Historic Preservation
 Boston Preservation Alliance
 California Preservation Foundation
 Cashiers Historical Society
 Cherokee County Historical Society
 Cleveland Restoration Society
 Colorado Preservation
 Columbus Landmarks Foundation
 Connecticut Trust for Historic Preservation
 Conservation Trust of Puerto Rico
 Cornerstones, Inc.
 Dade Heritage Trust
 Florida Trust for Historic Preservation
 Foundation for Historical Louisiana
 Georgia Trust for Historic Preservation
 Greater Portland Landmarks
 Guam Preservation Trust
 Heritage Alliance of Northeast Tennessee & Southwest Virginia
 Heritage Ohio
 Historic Augusta
 Historic Beaufort Foundation
 Historic Boston
 Historic Charleston Foundation
 Historic Chicago Bungalow Association
 Historic Columbus Foundation
 Historic Denver
 Historic Fort Worth
 Historic Hawaii Foundation
 Historic Kansas City Foundation
 Historic Macon Foundation
 Historic Madison
 Historic Mesquite
 Historic Nashville
 Historic New Carlisle
 Historic Preservation Alliance of Arkansas
 Historic Salisbury Foundation
 Historic Savannah Foundation
 Historic Seattle
 Historic Tyler
 Indiana Landmarks
 John Gilmore Riley Center/Museum for African American History & Culture
 Kansas Preservation Alliance
 Knox Heritage
 Landmark Society of Western New York
 Landmarks Illinois
 Los Alamos Historical Society and Museum
 Los Angeles Conservancy
 Louisiana Landmarks Society
 Louisiana Trust for Historic Preservation
 Madison Trust for Historic Preservation
 Maine Preservation
 Michigan Historic Preservation Network
 Milwaukee Preservation Alliance
 Mississippi Heritage Trust
 Missouri Preservation
 Montana Preservation Alliance
 New Hampshire Preservation Alliance
 Newtown Macon
 Oberlin Heritage Center
 Palmetto Trust for Historic Preservation
 Park City Historical Society And Museum
 Pittsburgh History and Landmarks Foundation
 Preservation Alliance for Greater Philadelphia
 Preservation Alliance of Minnesota
 Preservation Alliance of West Virginia
 Preservation Chapel Hill
 Preservation Dallas
 Preservation Detroit
 Preservation Durham
 Preservation Greensboro
 Preservation Houston
 Preservation Kentucky
 Preservation League of New York State
 Preservation Louisville
 Preservation Maryland
 Preservation Massachusetts
 Preservation North Carolina
 Preservation Oklahoma
 Preservation Pennsylvania
 Preservation Resource Center of New Orleans
 Preservation Society of Asheville & Buncombe County
 Preservation Society of Charleston
 Preservation Texas
 Preservation Trust of Vermont
 Preservation Virginia
 Preserve Rhode Island
 Preserve South Dakota
 Providence Preservation Society
 Quapaw Quarter Association
 Restore Oregon
 San Antonio Conservation Society
 San Francisco Architectural Heritage
 San Jose Preservation Action Council
 Saratoga Springs Preservation Foundation
 Spokane Preservation Advocates
 Tennessee Preservation Trust
 Thomasville Landmarks
 Utah Heritage Foundation
 Vandalia Heritage Foundation
 Wabash Valley Trust
 Washington Trust for Historic Preservation
 Waterfront Historic Area League (Whale)

Heritage registers in the United States